Fehrenbacher may refer to
 Bruno Fehrenbacher (1895-1965), Abbot of Buckfast Abbey
 Don E. Fehrenbacher (1920-1997), American historian